The Roman Catholic  Parish church Saint John the Baptist, formerly Collegiate church Saint Florentius (Collégiale Saint-Florent) is the main church of the small city of Niederhaslach in Alsace. The building is widely considered one of the finest and most ornate examples of Gothic architecture and Gothic art in the Bas-Rhin departement of France.

History 
The church, which was originally dedicated to Florentius of Strasbourg, bishop of Strasbourg from 618–624, was built from 1274 on as a replacement for a building from the 7th century that had been the shrine since 810 (by order of bishop Ratho) of relics of the Saint. The new church was under construction until 1385: a fire on 4 June 1287 that destroyed everything but the choir as well as the accidental death of the architect Gerlach von Steinbach (the son of Erwin von Steinbach) in 1330 had slowed down its completion. The church was plundered during the German Peasants' War in 1525 and on 6 June 1633, it was burned by Swedish mercenaries during the Thirty Years' War. The building was neglected during the following two centuries and even served as a slaughterhouse in 1744. The French Revolution, however, spared the church, but dissolved the chapter to which it belonged. The church was thoroughly restored  from 1853 to 1887 by architects Émile Boeswillwald and Charles Winkler, and again from 1990 to  2006.

Niederhaslach's church is listed as a Monument historique since 1846  by the French Ministry of Culture.

Furnishing

Stained glass windows 
Niederhaslach's church prides itself with one of the most complete and well preserved/restored collections of medieval stained glass windows in Alsace after Strasbourg Cathedral. The nave and choir display a large number of windows from the 13th and 14th century, remarkable for their shining nuances of blue and red and the number and variety of represented human figures. They represent the life of Jesus and Mary as well as of John the Baptist. The most famous window, being the most original in its design, is the one showing the predication of John the Baptist, the central figure being displayed life-sized. The façade shows a rose window of the year 1325.

Sculptures 
Outside
 Grand portal of 1310 representing the Annunciation, the Coronation of Mary and the Legend of Saint Florentius
 Numerous gargoyles all around the building in the shape of humans and beasts 
 Remains of the cemetery: tombstones of clerical people from the 14th to the 18th century
 Bas-relief "Christ on the Mount of Olives" (1492).

Inside
 Representation of the Holy Sepulchre (14th century); tombstone of Gerlach von Steinbach (1330)
 Keystones of the Gothic vault
 Late medieval tomb of bishop Ratho
  Choir stalls (1691)
 Reliquary of Saint Florentius (1714)
 Life-sized group of statues "Crucifixion scene" (1740)

Pipe organ
On the inside of the façade is a pipe organ from 1903.

Gallery

Dimensions 
The known dimensions are as follows
 Height of spire: 
 Length of central nave: 
 Total length:

Sources and references

External links 

 
 

Churches in Bas-Rhin
Monuments historiques of Bas-Rhin
Roman Catholic churches in France
Gothic architecture in France